This article details the Bradford Bulls rugby league football club's 1998 season, the 3rd season of the Super League era.

Season review

February 1998

The 1998 season started off with a 48–10 win over Rochdale Hornets in the Challenge Cup 4th Round, it was in this game that Wigan Warriors legend Shaun Edwards made his try scoring debut with the Bulls. However soon they were knocked out of the Cup for the 1st time before the final since the Super League started. It was Castleford Tigers who scored late in the game to beat Bradford 26–21.

April 1998

Bradford started off their league hopes with a 38–6 win against newly promoted Huddersfield Giants. However they were brought down to earth when they lost 26–6 to arch-rivals Leeds Rhinos after a sublime display from fullback Iestyn Harris. Bradford were soon back winning points as they ground out a hard-fought 11–4 win against Sheffield Eagles. The Bulls managed to get their 1st back to back wins of the season as they struggled against Hull Sharks but just about scraped a 26–24 win.

May 1998

The Bulls won their next game 18–4 against St. Helens however the week after Halifax Blue Sox beat Bradford 21–16 in a thrilling encounter. Bradford bounced back though by stuffing Castleford Tigers 52–10 and then dispatched of London Broncos 17–14.

June 1998

June started off poor for the Bulls as they lost 28–10 to Warrington Wolves after Graeme Bradley was sent off. Bradford also lost to eventual champions Wigan Warriors 28–12. The Bulls bad run continued with a shock 11–10 loss to Salford City Reds with Paul Medley scoring Bradford's only try. Bradford got back to winning ways with a comprehensive 36–10 victory over Huddersfield Giants.

July 1998

Bradford got off to a great start in July as they beat arch-rivals Leeds Rhinos 33–22 at Headingley. The Bulls travelled to Tynecastle Stadium to play London Broncos in an attempt to spread rugby league into Scotland, the Bulls lost to London 22–8 with ex Bulls player Shaun Edwards pulling the strings for the Broncos.

August 1998

Sheffield Eagles added to the Bulls misery when they beat Bradford 38–18 to kick off August, however it wasn't long before the Bulls won again as they beat Hull Sharks 38–18 with Tevita Vaikona scoring 2 tries against his former side. Bradford were brought back to earth with a 33–25 defeat at St. Helens, a late Tommy Martyn try and a Sean Long drop goal won it for the Saints. Halifax Blue Sox continued their fine run of form by beating the Bulls 25–12 at The Shay. The final game in August saw the Bulls beat Castleford Tigers 24–8 to get back to winning ways.

September 1998

The month didn't start well for Bradford as they received a 34–8 hammering by London Broncos. The Bulls responded to this defeat by beating Warrington Wolves 36–8 at Odsal Stadium. The final two games saw contrasting results, the 1st saw the Bulls get hammered by Wigan Warriors 38–4 and the 2nd saw them destroy Salford City Reds 40–18 in the final league game of the year.

October 1998

The Bulls crashed out of the playoffs when they lost 46–24 to St. Helens at Knowsley Road.

1998 milestones

CCR4: Shaun Edwards and Tevita Vaikona scored their 1st tries for the Bulls.
CCR4: James Lowes kicked his 1st goal for the Bulls.
Round 2: Matt Calland scored his 25th try and reached 100 points for the Bulls.
Round 3: Nathan Graham kicked his 1st drop-goal for the Bulls.
Round 5: Steve McNamara reached 500 points for the Bulls.
Round 7: Robbie Paul scored his 5th hat-trick for the Bulls.
Round 12: Paul Deacon scored his 1st try and kicked his first goal for the Bulls.
Round 16: Nathan McAvoy scored his 1st try for the Bulls.
Round 19: Steve McNamara reached 600 points for the Bulls.
Round 23: Neil Harmon and Harvey Howard scored their 1st tries for the Bulls.

Table

1998 fixtures and results

1998 JJB Sports Super League

Challenge Cup

Playoffs

1998 squad statistics

 Appearances and points include (Super League, Challenge Cup and Play-offs)

References

External links
Bradford Bulls Website
Bradford Bulls in T&A
Bradford Bulls on Sky Sports
Bradford on Super League Site
Red,Black And Amber
BBC Sport-Rugby League 

Bradford Bulls seasons
Bradford Bulls